Thirteen goaltenders have scored a total of sixteen goals in National Hockey League (NHL) games. A goalkeeper can score by either shooting the puck into the net, or being awarded the goal as the last player on his team to touch the puck when an opponent scored an own goal. Of the sixteen goals, nine were scored by shooting the puck and seven were the result of own goals.

Goaltenders have participated in the offence, albeit in a limited way, since the earliest days of the sport. Before the creation of the NHL in 1917, there were some instances recorded of goaltenders rushing down the ice to participate in the play, occasionally scoring a goal. This practice fell out of favour with goalies and coaches as goaltending  training and equipment became more specialized, greatly reducing the goalie's ability to effectively participate in offensive play, and was eventually outlawed (goalies are not allowed to cross the centre red line to play the puck) after the Toronto Maple Leafs' Gary Smith was injured on such a rush in the 1966–67 NHL season. During the history of the league, there had been some near-misses by goaltenders, including attempts by Chuck Rayner by aiming at the empty net, or joining the attack. In 1977, Rogatien Vachon briefly became the first goaltender to score a goal after being credited following an own goal by the opponent, before it was given instead to a teammate by later video review.

Billy Smith of the New York Islanders became the first goaltender to score an NHL goal on November 28, 1979, when he was given credit following an own goal by the Colorado Rockies. Ron Hextall of the Philadelphia Flyers became the second goalkeeper to score, and the first to score by taking a shot. Martin Brodeur has scored the most NHL goals by a goaltender, with two in the regular season and one in the playoffs. 

The most recent goal was scored by Linus Ullmark from the Boston Bruins on February 25, 2023, against the Vancouver Canucks.

Technique
Under modern rules, the only realistic chance for the goaltender to score exists when the opposing goaltender is pulled for an extra attacker, leaving the six-foot-wide net at the other end of the rink empty. It is assumed that the opposing goaltender, if in net, would not commit a blunder. Furthermore, the goaltender is prohibited from travelling to the other side of rink; specifically, he is not allowed to cross the centre red line in order to participate in a play, where the position of the puck is prescribed as the "determining factor" by Rule 27 of the Official NHL Rule Book. The result is that the goaltender cannot participate in play in the opponent's zone, and must take a shot from his side of the rink. Coaches generally discourage any player from shooting at an empty net from their own side of the red line because if the shot goes wide, it results in an icing infraction (unless the team is short-handed, in which case they are allowed to ice the puck). This brings the face off back in the defensive zone and prohibits the offending team from making any substitutions.  In practice, a shot from the goaltender is taken from the side of his net, because further travel risks turning the puck over. Due to the distance between the two nets, the puck has to be shot with a trajectory and speed that prevents the opposing team from stopping it while it travels. All NHL goaltenders who have scored a goal by shooting the puck have done so with an empty net; the goals credited to goaltenders that did not shoot the puck were all the result of own goals by the opposing team who had their crease vacated.

Rule 27.7 was instituted in the 1966–67 season, after the Toronto Maple Leafs' Gary Smith had been knocked out by Montreal Canadiens defenceman J. C. Tremblay's bodycheck as the former was crossing the centre red line carrying the puck. Prior to the institution of the rule, the only recorded instances of goaltenders scoring goals involved them rushing to the other end of the rink, and they occurred generally in the early days of ice hockey, around 1900. Furthermore, prior to 1931, empty-net situations did not arise as it was not customary to pull the goaltender late in the game for an extra attacker in an effort to tie the game up. This technique is credited to Art Ross, coach of the Boston Bruins, who pulled Tiny Thompson in game two of the semifinals playoff series against the Montreal Canadiens. An instance of an attempted empty-net goal was recorded in 1947, when New York Rangers goaltender Chuck Rayner missed the net "by a whisper" which was vacated when the Toronto Maple Leafs had pulled Turk Broda.

History
Billy Smith of the New York Islanders, in the 1979–80 season, was the first goaltender to be credited with a goal in the NHL when Rob Ramage of the Colorado Rockies put the puck into his own empty net. Smith was the last Islander to have touched the puck, and by NHL rule 78.4, an unassisted goal is awarded to the last player on the scoring team who had contacted the puck, in the event of an own goal.

However, the participation of goaltenders in offence began long before Billy Smith's goal. The first recorded goal in competitive play, scored by a goaltender, was in 1905. According to a Montreal Star report, poor officiating resulted in only the goaltenders left on the ice in a February 18 game between the Montreal Westmounts and Quebec Bulldogs of Canadian Amateur Hockey League (CAHL). Fred Brophy (Montreal) and Hall of Famer Paddy Moran (Quebec) exchanged scoring attempts, before Brophy beat Moran, while the latter and most of the spectators "convulsed in laughter". Brophy repeated the feat a year later on March 7, 1906, by skating the length of the ice to score on goaltender Nathan Frye of the Montreal Victorias of the Eastern Canada Amateur Hockey Association (ECAHA).

The first goaltender credited with an assist in the NHL was Georges Vezina in the 1917–18 season, after a puck rebounded off his leg pad to a teammate who skated the length of the ice to score. In the 1935–36 season, Tiny Thompson became the first goaltender to gain an assist after making an intentional pass. During the Second World War, while playing for the All-Star Canadian Army team, goaltender Chuck Rayner carried the puck down the ice and beat the opposing goaltender, Art Jones. In the NHL, he made numerous unsuccessful attempts to duplicate this feat; as a member of the New York Rangers, Rayner attempted to score both by aiming at an empty net and by rushing down the rink. There are at least two recorded instances of him skating to the other side of the ice after making a save, and he was experimentally used on the point during power-plays in late 1940s.

In the 1976–77 season, Los Angeles Kings goaltender Rogie Vachon briefly became the first goaltender to be credited with a goal when the opposing New York Islanders scored on themselves during a delayed penalty; however, after video review, the goal was given to Vic Venasky as it was determined that he was the last Kings player to touch the puck before it went in the net. A similar case occurred in 1987 when the Islanders' Brent Sutter scored on his own net during a delayed penalty; the cross-town rival Rangers' Bob Froese was credited with the goal, briefly becoming the second
goaltender to have been credited with an NHL goal. Later video review concluded that Froese had not touched the puck at all, and the goal was awarded to David Shaw.

The first goaltender to score a goal by intentionally shooting the puck into the opponent's net was the Philadelphia Flyers' Ron Hextall, who on December 8, 1987, scored on an empty net after Boston pulled their goaltender, Rejean Lemelin, for a sixth attacker late in the third period. The most recent goaltender to have scored a goal by deliberately shooting the puck into his opponents' net was Linus Ullmark, on February 25, 2023.

Of the sixteen goals scored by NHL goaltenders, nine were shot into the opposing team's net by the goaltender. Two goaltenders have scored a goal and earned a shutout in the same game. Damian Rhodes, playing for the Ottawa Senators, was credited with a goal in a 6–0 win over the New Jersey Devils on January 2, 1999, and Jose Theodore, playing for the Montreal Canadiens, shot the puck into the New York Islanders' empty net in a 3–0 victory on January 2, 2001, exactly two years later. Theodore's shot was the only backhand of the nine. In addition to being the first goaltender to be credited with a goal, Billy Smith was the only goaltender to have scored in a game that he lost.

Chris Mason and Damian Rhodes are the only goalies to be credited with a goal in both the AHL and the NHL. Of the 16 goals, the New Jersey Devils franchise has been involved in six of them, three goals for (highest total) and three goals against (highest total), including the first ever goaltender goal when scored on in their previous incarnation as the Colorado Rockies.

While both Ron Hextall and Martin Brodeur have scored more than one goal, Hextall is the only goaltender to score twice by directly shooting the puck into the opponent's net. Brodeur's second and third goals were own goals by the other team, where Brodeur received credit for touching the puck last. Brodeur's second goal is the only game-winning goal scored by a goaltender.  Hextall and Brodeur both scored in a playoff game as well as a regular season game. Hextall's second goal is the only goal scored by a goaltender while his team was short handed, and Evgeni Nabokov and Martin Brodeur are the only goalies who scored on a power play. Martin Brodeur is the only goalie to score against another goalie, when he scored against Dan Ellis on his third career goal, although Ellis was on his way to the bench for an extra attacker on a delayed penalty call and failed to make it back to the net in time to prevent the puck from entering the goal.  Brodeur is also the only goalie who has both scored an empty net goal while the opposing goalie was on the bench, as well as having been the goalie on the bench when another goalie was credited with a goal.

Mike Smith was the next goaltender to score a goal in the NHL, which he managed to do in a 5–2 victory of the Phoenix Coyotes over the Detroit Red Wings on October 19, 2013. He scored the goal with only 1/10 of a second left in the third period. He is also the only goaltender to be credited with a goal in both the NHL and the ECHL, having scored a goal as a member of the Lexington Men O' War on October 26, 2002, against the Dayton Bombers.

Pekka Rinne of the Nashville Predators scored on a shot at an empty net during a 5–2 win over the Chicago Blackhawks on January 9, 2020, making him the first NHL goaltender to score a goal in six years as well as the first to score during the 2020s. Linus Ullmark of the Boston Bruins became the second to score in the 2020s on February 25, 2023, and is currently the most recent goaltender to score a goal in an NHL game.

Scorers
Key

Notes

See also
List of goalkeepers who have scored in Association football

Bibliography

References

Goaltenders who have scored a goal
Goaltenders who have scored a goal